Talkh may refer to:
 Talkh, alternate name of Tahar, Iran, Hormozgan Province

 Talkh-e Ataher, Hormozgan Province
 Talkh, Razavi Khorasan

See also
 Talkh Ab (disambiguation)
 Talkhab (disambiguation)
 Tang Talkh (disambiguation)